At the 1996 Summer Olympics, ten fencing events were contested. Women's épée events made a debut at these Games.

Medal summary

Men's events

Women's events

Medal table
Russia finished atop of the fencing medal table at the 1996 Summer Olympics.

Participating nations
A total of 224 fencers (136 men and 88 women) from 46 nations competed at the Atlanta Games:

References

External links
Official Olympic Report

 
1996 Summer Olympics events
1996
1996 in fencing
International fencing competitions hosted by the United States